Overview of the 2015 season of association football in the Maldives.

National teams

Maldives national football team

International Friendlies

2018 FIFA World Cup qualification

Maldives women's national football team

Pre-season friendly club tournament

POMIS Cup

League season

Premier League

Second Division

Third Division

References 
 Dhivehi League to rebrand as Dhivehi Premier League at Maldivesoccer
 Huge challenges ahead: Bassam at Maldivesoccer